Action was a controversial weekly British children's anthology comic that was published by IPC Magazines, starting on 14 February 1976, until November 1977.

Concerns over the comic's violent content saw it withdrawn from sale on 16 October 1976. It then reappeared the following month, in a toned-down form, and continued publication until 12 November 1977, at which point it was merged with Battle Picture Weekly. Despite its short lifespan, Action was highly influential on the British comics scene, and was a direct forerunner of the long-running 2000 AD.

Publication history
The comic was devised in 1975 by freelance writer/editor Pat Mills, at the request of publishing house IPC. It was intended to reflect the changing social and political times of the late 1970s, and to compete with DC Thomson's war-themed Warlord title. Warlord was a new type of British boys adventure comic, focusing largely on military action, with tougher heroes and storylines than had been seen previously. The title was a commercial success, and initially inspired IPC to launch Battle Picture Weekly in direct competition. Battle had been created by Pat Mills and fellow freelancer John Wagner, and also proved popular. In comparison, although Action featured some war based stories, it was intended to be more contemporary, relevant and realistic for young readers. IPC's John Sanders was chosen to edit the title, with Mills, Wagner, and Steve MacManus contributing stories. The team evaluated several names, including Boots and Dr Martens. Originally, it was proposed that the comic was to have been called Action 76, with the intention that the title would then increment each year, but this idea was dropped and it was named simply Action.

Many of the stories in Action were what Mills called "dead cribs", essentially rip-offs of popular films, books and comic heroes. Rather than being a straight copy, the "cribs" in Action had their own slant on the idea. For example, Hook Jaw combined environmental issues with the graphic gore and shark anti-hero of Steven Spielberg's film Jaws (1975), a huge box-office success, whilst Hellman of Hammer Force was a Warlord/Battle-style World War II adventure told from the point of view of a German Panzer tank commander, as had been popularised by the grisly novels of Sven Hassel.

The first issue of Action was published on 7 February 1976, with a cover date of 14 February 1976. The comic was instantly popular, particularly for its gritty tone and unusually graphic gore. Within weeks the media had picked up on the title's violent content. The London Evening Standard and The Sun ran major articles on the comic, with the latter echoing the Victorian "penny dreadful" by dubbing Action "the sevenpenny nightmare" (the cover price was 7p). Over the next few months Action was the focus of a campaign led by Mary Whitehouse, of the National Viewers and Listeners Association, to censor or ban the comic. IPC eventually started to moderate the strips in order to forestall the commercial damage that would have arisen from possible boycotts by newsagent chains such as W.H. Smith.

In September 1976 John Sanders appeared on the BBC television programme Nationwide, where he defended the comic in a vigorous interview with Frank Bough. A week after the Nationwide feature, the detrimental effect of Action on the nation's youth was briefly debated in the House of Commons. Although the comic remained popular with its readers, its days were numbered. Pressure from within IPC's higher management over worries that the two major national newsagent chains, W.H. Smith and John Menzies, would refuse to stock not just Action, but all of IPC's line, led to the 23 October issue (the 37th) being pulped.

After one month of planning, the title returned to sale on 27 November 1976 (cover date 4 December), but the graphic violence had been toned down, and the previous sense of anarchism was replaced by a safer, blander and more conventional feel. Most of the existing stories continued but were no longer drenched in blood and gore, and instead were full of more reliable heroes and traditional villains.

With the comic no longer having a unique format, sales dropped quite drastically. The last issue before Action was merged with IPC stable-mate Battle, a traditional war story based comic, was published on 5 November 1977 – dated 11 November. Battle then became re-titled as Battle Action until 1982, at which point the Action name was dropped entirely. However 'Action' annuals continued to be published separately from 'Battle' annuals yearly up until 1985.

Legacy
Mills learned how to deal with the launch of a varied, edgy comic when planning the launch of 2000 AD the following year. By setting the comic's stories in a science fiction context, and creating the violent character of Judge Dredd as a law-upholding policeman, Mills hoped to avoid the controversy that had ultimately led to the demise of Action. Some strips with an Action feel were printed in early issues of 2000 AD, including Flesh, which was a violent time-travel story involving dinosaurs, and Shako, which was essentially Hook Jaw but with a polar bear instead of a shark.

Action – The Story of a Violent Comic
In 1990 Titan Books released Action – The Story of a Violent Comic written by Martin Barker. This was a history of the comic, as well as a study of the effects of the ban.
In this book Barker revealed that 30 copies of the pulped 23 October 1976 issue were saved and the book prints many of the strips from that issue, plus following issues thanks to Barker coming into possession of unpublished art. The book reveals just how much Action was being censored at an editorial level, and the route the title was heading in before it was cancelled.

2020 special
In spring 2020 Rebellion Developments (the publishers of 2000AD) published an Action Special 2020 under its Treasury of British Comics imprint. This included a new Hellman strip by writer Garth Ennis and the original series artist Mike Dorey, and other new stories such as Hookjaw, Dredger and Kids Rule OK! Ennis won the 2021 Irish Comics News Award for Best Irish Writer for this story.

This was followed by a new Hookjaw series in 2000AD regular issues from September to November 2020.

2022 special
In June 2022 Rebellion published a hardcover Battle Action Special with new stories featuring characters from both comics, written by Garth Ennis and with various artists.

Major stories
 Hook Jaw was created by Mills as a Jaws cash-in and the flagship title of the comic. The strip was scripted by Ken Armstrong and drawn by Ramon Sola. Hook Jaw is a massive great white shark and the hero of the series, even though he spends most of his time eating most of the human cast of characters. The name Hook Jaw comes from the gaff hook which remains stuck in the shark's jaw, after some fisherman tried to catch the creature shortly before being eaten by it. Mills gave the strip an environmental message by having Hook Jaw eat corrupt humans seeking to exploit or ruin the seas, as well as anyone else unlucky enough to get near him. Hook Jaw appeared in three stories before the ban. The natural geographical habitat of great white sharks was irrelevant; the first story was set on an oil rig in the North Sea, the second was set on an island resort in the Caribbean, and the third was set just off the south coast of England. Hook Jaw returned after the ban, but no longer ate as many people, and if he did it was discreetly off panel. The strip also lost the environmental themes Mills had sought to place in it. Spitfire Comics in 2007 released a collection of the pre-ban strips in Collected Hook Jaw vol.1.
 BlackJack was created by John Wagner, with art by Trigo. It told the story of Jack Barron, a professional boxer who fights in order to help poor kids escape the hard life he had as a youth, whilst knowing that he also runs the risk of going blind. The strip was criticised for its racist title but was also one of the earliest examples of a black character being portrayed as the hero of a British comic strip.
 Death Game 1999 was written by Tom Tully. The series was a cash-in on the success of Rollerball and dealt with a lethal future sport played by condemned prisoners. Art was provided by Ian Gibson and Massimo Bellardinelli, among others. The strip was almost as popular as Hook Jaw. After the relaunch Death Game 1999 became re-titled as Spinball, and turned into a formulaic adventure strip without the moral ambiguities which featured in the original.
 Kids Rule OK! was written by Jack Adrian with art by Mike White; this series drew more criticism and moral outrage than any other. Set in a dystopian near-future London, a plague has wiped out most of the adult population, with the result that violent gangs of children now run riot. The strip was instantly controversial with its heavy anti-authoritarian tone and anarchic extreme violence. The strip never survived the ban; two episodes were destroyed by IPC entirely, whilst those that did survive were heavily edited. A full version of the story, with a text insert to cover the missing episodes, can be found in Action – The Story of a Violent Comic.
 Hellman of Hammer Force, written by Gerry Finley-Day and drawn by Mike Dorey, was the story of a ruthless German Panzer tank major. Inspired by the then-popular war novels of Sven Hassel, it established a pattern followed by 2000 AD for having an unsympathetic character as the anti-hero. The strip returned after the ban, but stripped of its violence and ambiguous politics, it became a conventional war adventure story. Continued in Battle Picture Weekly after Action was cancelled.
 Dredger was a tough spy. The strip was popular due to its increasingly bizarre and violent action scenes. The strip survived the ban, but like the others became a conventional adventure strip.
 Look Out For Lefty was an unconventional football strip based on the adventures of Kenny Lampton, a working-class teenager whose powerful left foot gave him the nickname of "Lefty". It was unlike any other football strips in British boys' comics at the time because the strip would include football hooliganism, as well as Lefty often not being a clean-cut hero, being prone to brawling, partying, and womanising. The violence on display in the strip mirrored the real-life football violence taking place at the time. After the ban, the strip became a conventional Roy of the Rovers–type strip and removed any hint of controversy. The strip was written by Tom Tully, with art from Barrie Mitchell and Tony Harding.

Collected editions
Spitfire Comics released a Hook Jaw trade paperback:
The Collected Hook Jaw (104 pages, February 2007)

Notes

References

Action: The Story of a Violent Comic (by Martin Barker, 286 pages, Titan Books, 1990)
List of Action characters at ComicsUK.co.uk

External links
Action – The Sevenpenny Nightmare
Action, BritishComics.com
"Too much action: how kids' comic Action drowned in its own ultraviolence" by David Burnett, The Guardian, 21 October 2016
Strip Hooligans – The story of the banned comic Action

Censorship in the United Kingdom
Comics magazines published in the United Kingdom
Comics by Pat Mills
Defunct British comics
1976 comics debuts
Magazines established in 1976
Magazines disestablished in 1976
Weekly magazines published in the United Kingdom